Kemran Nurillaev (born 5 February 1997) is an Uzbek judoka.

He is the silver medallist of the 2021 Judo Grand Slam Tbilisi in the -60 kg category.

References

External links
 

1997 births
Living people
Uzbekistani male judoka
20th-century Uzbekistani people
21st-century Uzbekistani people